Čenej is a suburban settlement of the city of Novi Sad, Serbia. The village has a Serb ethnic majority and a population numbering 2,115 people (2002 census).

Name
In Serbian, the village is known as Ченеј or Čenej, in Croatian as Čenej, and in Hungarian as Csenej.

Geography
It is located in the north-eastern part of the Novi Sad municipality. Two small neighbouring settlements known as Pejićevi Salaši and Nemanovci are also officially regarded as parts of Čenej.

History and culture
In 1237, a settlement named terra Chemey was mentioned at this location. The modern village of Čenej emanated from the grouped farms (salaši) around the local road Bački Jarak - Zmajevo. There is a Serb Orthodox church from 1835 in the village.

Demographics

Tourism
Čenej is well known in the region for its ethno tourism. There is a number of ethno farms called salaši, where visitors can relax and enjoy local food in an authentic ambiance.

There is also a small airport in the vicinity, where the more daring can go parachuting.

See also
Novi Sad
List of places in Serbia
List of cities, towns and villages in Vojvodina

References

 Slobodan Ćurčić, Broj stanovnika Vojvodine, Novi Sad, 1996.

External links

 Cenej Tourism

Suburbs of Novi Sad
Places in Bačka
South Bačka District